Benjamin Contee (1755 – November 30, 1815) was an American Episcopal priest and statesman from Maryland. He was an officer in the American Revolutionary War, a delegate to the Confederation Congress, and member of the first United States House of Representatives.

Early life
Contee was the son of Col. Thomas Contee (1729–1811) and Sarah Fendall (1732–1793). He was born at "Brookefield", near Nottingham, Prince George's County, Maryland, the home of his father, and original home of his ancestor, Maj. Thomas Brooke, Sr., Esq. (1632–1676).

Military and political career
At beginning of the Revolutionary War, Contee entered the Continental Army, rising to the rank of captain of the 3rd Maryland Regiment, which proved to be one of the army's elite units until its near annihilation at the Battle of Camden.

After the war he was elected to the Maryland House of Delegates, where he served from 1785 to 1787.  He served as a delegate to the Confederation Congress from 1787 to 1788, and the third district of Maryland in the U.S. Congress from 1789 to 1791. Along with his brother Alexander Contee (1752–1810), he became a merchant of London, at their stores in Nottingham, Queen Anne and Upper Marlboro. He was declared insolvent due to “mishaps in trade”. After having served in Congress, he went to Europe and traveled through Spain, France, and England.

Marriage and children
On April 8, 1788, he married his cousin, Sarah Russell Lee (1766–1810).  Sarah was born at "Blenheim" in 1766, and died December 6, 1810 at "Bromont", near Newburg, Charles Co., Maryland.  Sarah was the daughter of Philip Thomas Lee (1736–1778) and Ann Russell (died 1777) of England. The Contees' children were Sarah "Sallie" Elinor Contee (1789 – c. 1815), Philip Ashton Lee Contee, Sr. (1795–1842), Edmund Henry Contee (1799–1832), and Alice Lee Contee (1803–1868), who married Gov. Joseph Kent.

Episcopal minister
On his return to America he completed his study in theology and was admitted to holy orders in 1803 by Rev. Thomas John Claggett, Bishop of Maryland, a neighbor, friend, helper and patriot of the Revolution.  That same year he became rector of William & Mary's, Charles County.  He was a distinguished minister of the Episcopal Church and for several years the incumbent of Port Tobacco Parish, Charles County, Maryland.  He was a native of Prince George's County and brought up in the church.  In 1808, he added Trinity, and in 1811, St. Paul's, Prince George's Co., Maryland, to his charge.  He continued as a Judge of the Orphan's Court, and was always in the Standing Committee.

Property
Benjamin resided briefly in the mid-1790s at "Blenheim".  At the time of his death he was living at the glebe house of Trinity Parish near Allen's Fresh.  Benjamin and his wife were more than likely interred in the Contee cemetery at "Locust Hill" just outside Port Tobacco, which has been destroyed.  If not there, then they were buried in the original Christ Church cemetery in Port Tobacco, which is now covered by swamp.

References

Fendall, Douglas Allen. The Descendants of Governor Josias Fendall.
(attained from several sources including:  "Across the Years in Price George's County").
"Clergy in Maryland of the Protestant Episcopal Church, Since the Independence of 1783".
Purcell, L. Edward. Who Was Who in the American Revolution. New York: Facts on File, 1993. . Reference for military and congressional service only, not family information.

External links

 Retrieved on 2009-05-07

Fendall family
1755 births
1815 deaths
People from Nottingham, Maryland
18th-century American Episcopalians
Continental Congressmen from Maryland
Members of the United States House of Representatives from Maryland
Members of the Maryland House of Delegates
Continental Army officers from Maryland
American Episcopal priests
18th-century American politicians
19th-century American Episcopalians
People of colonial Maryland
Contee family
Lee family of Virginia